The East Lancs 1984-style double-deck body is a type of double-decker bus body with a step-entrance, built on several different chassis by East Lancashire Coachbuilders in England.

Chassis
Several different chassis types were fitted with this style of bodywork. These include:
 Dennis Dominator
 Volvo B10M
 Leyland Olympian
 Scania N112 and N113
 Volvo B58 (rebody)

Description
This distinctive style of bodywork has a downward-sloping front window bay on the upper deck, with both top and bottom edges angled downwards. The side windows are square-cornered. A large double-curvature upper deck windscreen (either single-piece or two-piece) is one of the most distinctive features.

Originally a tall, wrap-around lower deck windscreen was fitted, but some batches were fitted with a double-curvature windscreen, with either a straight or an arched top.

A batch of Dennis Dominators built for Southampton Citybus have bodywork which is mostly to this style, including the downswept front upper deck window bay, but with a divided flat upper deck windscreen in place of the distinctive double-curvature screen.

History
This design was introduced in 1984. Early examples included Dennis Dominators for Leicester CityBus. At first it was often specified for coach use, sometimes by operators that at the same time specified one of the plainer designs for bus use. This has sometimes earned it the misnomer "coach body", but in fact a majority were double-decker buses.

Later orders came from Drawlane subsidiaries London & Country, North Western and Midland Red North.

Naming
This design had no official name that was used publicly, however it has been referred to as the Droop Nose Design.

See also

 List of buses

References

Double-decker buses
1984
Vehicles introduced in 1984